Maharaj Ghulam Hussain Kathak (1905 – 2001) was a classical dancer and teacher.

Early life
Ghulam Hussain was born in Calcutta in a syed family.

Initially he was in Agha Hashar's drama company later he once saw Acchan mahraj's performance there first time this was his first encounter with Kathak.After the downfall of drama in 1930 as an art, he along with other artists gathered there in Rampur where he became ganda band disciple of Mahraj je and learnt from him.

Migration to Pakistan
Maharaj Ghulam Hussain Kathak migrated to Karachi after the partition and lived there before moving to Lahore in his later years. He has been a major exponent in the arts and teaching of classical kathak dance in Pakistan, for over four decades.

Legacy 
Maharaj Ghulam Hussain Kathak was the guru of Pakistani classical dancer Nahid Siddiqui, Nighat Chaodhry. Fasih Ur Rehman, a discipline of Ghulam Hussain, has been carrying on his legacy.

References

1905 births
2001 deaths
Dance teachers
Dance in Pakistan
Artists from Kolkata
Muhajir people
People from Karachi
People from Lahore
Recipients of the Pride of Performance
Nigar Award winners
Pakistani male dancers